Saboo may refer to:
 Saboo (Surname in Maheshwari Hindu Caste)
 Saboo, Leh, a village in India
 Gopal Saboo (fl. 1967–1971), Indian politician
 Saboo, a character in The Mighty Boosh
 Sabu, a character in Chacha Chaudhary comics

See also 
 Sabu (disambiguation)